Chandler Regional Medical Center is a full-service, acute care, not-for-profit hospital providing healthcare to the East Valley of the Phoenix Arizona metropolitan area. Services offered include cardiovascular, emergency care with a level I trauma center, family birth center, gastroenterology, pediatric and adolescent, sleep center, orthopedics, and diagnostic services. The hospital is a member of Dignity Health, one of the largest healthcare systems in the west with 40 hospitals in Arizona, California and Nevada.

History
The Chandler's Lions Club started the idea of creating a hospital in Chandler, Arizona in 1956. When the hospital opened in July 1961 with 40 beds it was known as Chandler Community Hospital.

1959: State officials approved creation of Maricopa Hospital District Number one and voters approved a 40-bed hospital bond of $650,000.

1961:In July, Chandler Community Hospital opened with 40 beds at the corner of McQueen Rd and Williams Field Rd, (Now Chandler Blvd) in Chandler.

1984:In February, Chandler Community Hospital hosted the grand opening of the new campus at Dobson Rd and Frye Rd in Chandler.

2007:Name changed to Chandler Regional Medical Center.

Leadership
List of Chandler Regional Medical Center Chiefs of Staff

Acquired from Chandler Regional Medical Center on January 7, 2019
Role of Chief of Staff began to be known as President Medical Staff in 2014 with Dr. Yagnesh Patel.
Died while serving as Chief of Staff Clifford J. Goodman, MD 
Short term of service for Dr. Mark Walmer

Hospital Network Association
Chandler Regional Medical Center was founded in 1961 and stayed an independent community hospital until merging with Catholic Healthcare West in 1999  joining St. Joseph's Hospital and Medical Center the first affiliated hospital in Arizona. CHW has gained international renown for the Barrow Neurological Institute, a leader in treatment of brain and spinal cord diseases and injuries. Also in the East Valley, Mercy Gilbert Medical Center has been open since 2006.

Catholic Healthcare West is now known as Dignity Health.

In 2018 Dignity Health and Catholic Health Initiatives (CHI) received approval from the Catholic Church through the Vatican to merge. CHI-Dignity merger cleared by Vatican

References

Hospitals in Arizona
Trauma centers